Finglas is a northwestern outer suburb of Dublin, Ireland. It lies close to Junction 5 of the M50 motorway, and the N2 road. Finglas lies mainly in the postal district of Dublin 11.

Finglas is the core of a civil parish of the same name in the barony of Castleknock.

Name

The name Finglas, meaning clear streamlet, is derived from the Finglas River, which passed through the historic settlement.

Geography
The Tolka runs through western and southern Finglas, and forms part of the boundary between Finglas and Glasnevin. Flowing from the north is the stream, the Finglas River, for which the area is named, forming in turn from branches from the townlands of Grange and Kildonan to the north. After meeting a tributary, the St. Margaret's Road Stream, the Finglas flows through the village centre in culvert, and along the eastern side of Finglas Road, joining the Tolka at Finglas Bridge. To the west of the village centre rises the Finglaswood Stream, which joins the River Tolka via an Integrated Constructed Wetland near a small civic golf course.

History

Early history
Finglas was originally the site of an Early Christian abbey, the origin of which has been associated, from early times, with the name of St. Cainnech, or Canice, the patron of Kilkenny, said to have founded it in 560 A.D. According to an ancient legend, the ground on which Finglas stands had been sanctified by St. Patrick, who is said to have uttered a prophecy that a great town would arise at the ford of hurdles in the vale beneath. The Nethercross from the first abbey can be seen today in the old graveyard.

St. Canice is said to have been born at Glengiven near Derry. Several primary schools and churches in the area have been named after Canice, including the local Church of Ireland church (built in 1843) and Roman Catholic church (built in 1920 on the site of a much earlier mass house).

Early modern period

The Finglas or Finglass family,  who were prominent in the legal profession and in politics in the sixteenth century, took their name from the district.

In 1649, the Duke of Ormonde used Finglas as a staging post for his army before launching an unsuccessful Siege of Dublin.

Following the Battle of the Boyne in 1690, Finglas was used as a camp for four days by William of Orange en route to Dublin city. While there he issued the Declaration of Finglas, offering a pardon for many of James II's defeated supporters.

20th century onwards
In 1932, Ireland's first commercial airport was set up at Kildonan in Finglas. It was the site for the first Irish commercial aircraft, a Desoutter Mark II aircraft "EI-AAD", and the first commercial air taxi service, the Iona National Air Taxis and Flying School.

In the 1950s, Finglas was developed with extensive housing estates, to rehouse many north inner-city Dublin residents. Many of these housing estates particularly in Finglas West were named after prominent Irish republicans from early 20th-century Irish history including Barry, Casement, Plunkett, Mellows, McKee, Clune and Clancy.

Amenities
In the village centre are a range of shops, including one of the first-established Superquinn stores (since rebranded as SuperValu), banking facilities, pubs and restaurants. To the north are several light industrial estates.

Charlestown Shopping Centre and Clearwater Shopping Centre, are located outside the village core, to the north and south of Finglas respectively.

Finglas is home to one of Dublin's four Road Safety Authority Driving Testing Centres, which is located in Jamestown Business Park.

The Finglas Maypole Arts Festival was launched in 2019. In its first year, the festival committee was part of a steering group that got the first blue plaque in Finglas – to honour the uileann piper Séamus Ennis.

Education

There are 13 primary and national schools in the Finglas area, and 6 secondary schools. Coláiste Íde College of Further Education is located in Finglas West and offers third level courses.

Sports
The Rugby Union club Unidare RFC and the GAA club Erins Isle are based in the area. Soccer clubs include Tolka Rovers F.C., Valley Park United, WFTA Football Club, Willows FC and Finglas Celtic FC, Rivermount Football Club and Beneavin F.C.

Transport
Finglas is served by a number of bus routes operated by Dublin Bus and Go-Ahead Ireland. These include the 9, N4, N6, 40, 40B, 40D, 40E, 83, 83A,140 & 220. The main route serving the area is the number 40 which runs between Charlestown Shopping Centre and Liffey Valley via Dublin city centre. A new route, the 40E, was also introduced from Tyrellstown to provide a direct link to the extended Luas Green Line in Broombridge. Other routes serving the area include the 17A which runs between Kilbarrack to Blanchardstown, the 140 which runs to Rathmines via the city centre and the 83 which runs to Kimmage via Glasnevin and the city centre. It is also served by the 88N Nitelink service. Two Bus Éireann routes also serve Finglas, passing along the main Finglas Road, including the 103 from Duleek/Kilmoon Cross/Ashbourne to the city centre.

Representation and governance
Finglas is in the jurisdiction of Dublin City Council, and for local elections it is part of the Finglas-Ballymun local electoral area.

Finglas is part of the Dublin North-West constituency for elections to Dáil Éireann.

The civil parish of Finglas is a civil parish in the barony of Castleknock.

Notable people

Finglas has been the home of a number of public figures including:
Dermot Bolger, writer and poet, whose novels The Woman's Daughter and Night Shift are set in Finglas
Paul "Bono" Hewson, lead singer of U2
Charles Bowden, Irish criminal 
Gerard Byrne (born 1958), Irish artist
Declan Cassidy filmmaker, television producer and author
Patrick Clarke (filmmaker) The opening scene from Beyond the Pale (film) was shot in Erin's Isle GAA Club
Christy Dignam, Joe Jewell, and Alan Downey, Aslan musicians
Martin Doherty, volunteer for the Provisional Irish Republican Army
Regina Doherty, Fine Gael Senator and former Minister for Social Protection
Eamon "The Don" Dunne, Irish crime boss
Dessie Ellis, Sinn Féin TD
Séamus Ennis, Uilleann piper
Mairead Farrell, radio and television personality
Pat Fenlon, Football manager 
Tony Fenton, Today FM DJ
Patrick Finglas (died 1537), Lord Chief Justice of Ireland
John Fogarty CSSp, Superior General of the Congregation of the Holy Spirit
Niamh Kavanagh, Eurovision Song Contest 1993 winner, and Irish representative for the Eurovision Song Contest 2010
Dick McKee, volunteer for the Irish Republican Army
Colm Meaney, actor
Brendan O'Carroll, comedian and actor
Stephen O'Rahilly, Chair of Clinical Biochemistry and Medicine at the University of Cambridge. Endocrinologist and scientist researching obesity and diabetes
Spiral, a former Big Brother contestant, who wrote, performed and released a song about Finglas
And in sport:
Irish international footballers: Ronnie Whelan, Frank Stapleton, David O'Leary, Mark Kinsella, Stephen Kelly, Alan Moore, and footballers John Keogh, Cliff Byrne, and Derek Brazil.
All Ireland winning Dublin GAA players: Barney Rock, Jason Sherlock, James McCarthy and Charlie Redmond

See also

 List of towns and villages in Ireland
 List of abbeys and priories in Ireland (County Dublin)

References

 
Towns and villages in Dublin (city)